Benjamin Salmon (9 January 1906 – 24 January 1979) was an Australian cricketer. He played five first-class matches for New South Wales between 1924/25 and 1931/32.

See also
 List of New South Wales representative cricketers

References

External links
 

1906 births
1979 deaths
Australian cricketers
New South Wales cricketers
Cricketers from Melbourne